Andrine Flemmen (born 29 December 1974 in Molde) is a retired Norwegian alpine skier. Her favourite discipline was giant slalom. In this discipline she won three World Cup races. Her career highlight was a silver medal at the WC 1999 in Vail, with gold going to the Austrian Alexandra Meissnitzer.

World Cup victories

References

1974 births
Living people
People from Molde
Norwegian female alpine skiers
Alpine skiers at the 1998 Winter Olympics
Alpine skiers at the 2002 Winter Olympics
Olympic alpine skiers of Norway
Sportspeople from Møre og Romsdal